William Hare may refer to:

William Hare (murderer) (1792 or 1804 - after 1829), Irish criminal, member of the infamous Edinburgh duo of Burke and Hare
William D. Hare (1834–1910), Oregon politician
William Hobart Hare (1838–1909), Episcopal bishop in America
William G. Hare (1882–1971), Oregon politician
William Hare (philosopher) (born 1944), English academic, professor of education and philosophy in Halifax, Nova Scotia since 1970
William Hare (sport shooter) (1935–2005), Canadian Olympic sports shooter
William Hare, 1st Earl of Listowel (1751–1837), Irish peer and Member of Parliament
William Hare, 2nd Earl of Listowel (1801–1856), grandson of the 1st Earl, peer and Member of Parliament
William Hare, 3rd Earl of Listowel (1833–1924), son of the 2nd Earl, Baron Hare, Liberal politician 
William Hare, 5th Earl of Listowel (1906–1997), grandson of the 3rd Earl, Labour politician
William Hare Group, a UK based structural steel contractor

See also
Earl of Listowel